Mystic Defender is a two-dimensional action run and gun video game released for the Sega Genesis. Originally titled  in Japan and based on the anime/manga Kujaku Ō, it is the sequel to SpellCaster for the Master System.

Plot
Mystic Defender takes place in an alternate Japan fantasy setting in which the anarchistic sorcerer Zareth kidnaps a young woman named Alexandra. Zareth plans to use Alexandra as a sacrifice for the resurrecting of an ancient and evil god known as Zao. Not long after the kidnapping, Zareth's plan becomes apparent as Azuchi castle - the dwelling of Zao - rises from the waters.

Joe Yamato, an experienced sorcerer, is called into action to save Alexandra and stop Zareth's plan to resurrect Zao by battling his way through the dark and bizarre disciples and demons of Zao.

Gameplay
The players only means of defense in the game is the use of magical spells that the player can acquire during game play (by picking the power up).

Players start with a single shooting ball of energy that can be charged to fire one powerful shot, but players can also acquire a spiritual flame that can be pointed in straight and diagonal directions and when charged can reach good distances and a spherical power that launches ricocheting spheres around the screen that multiply when fully charged.

Aside from these powers, players can also use a screen-clearing power that summons a three-headed dragon that destroys all enemies and fired shots on screen.

External links

Mystic Defender at GameFAQs

1989 video games
Fantasy video games
Platform games
Sega video games
Sega Genesis games
Sega Genesis-only games
Video games set in Japan
Video games developed in Japan